Fulton County is the name of eight counties in the United States of America.  Most are named for Robert Fulton, inventor of the first practical steamboat:
Fulton County, Arkansas, named after Governor William Savin Fulton
Fulton County, Georgia, the most populous of Georgia's counties and by far the most populous county bearing the name
Fulton County Sheriff's Office (Georgia)
Fulton County, Illinois
Fulton County, Indiana
Fulton County, Kentucky
Fulton County, New York
Fulton County, Ohio
Fulton County, Pennsylvania

Other uses
Fulton County (novel) by James Goldman
Atlanta–Fulton County Stadium, former home to the Atlanta Braves (1966–96) and the Atlanta Falcons (1966–91)